Autumnal is the seventh full-length album by the Spanish power metal band Dark Moor. The recording of this album was announced in early 2008, with constant updates posted on their website since then.

The title of the album was revealed on November 16, 2008 on Dark Moor's website, along with the cover art and the official track listing. The first single from the album, "On the Hill of Dreams" was posted on their Myspace one month later on December 16, 2008. Towards the end of the year, December 29, it was revealed that Dani Fernandez would no longer be playing with them. The next day, they announced Dark Moor's new bassist would be Mario Garcia. This album also features the voice of Itea Benedicto, a soprano and current lead singer in the Spanish band Niobeth.

A video was shot for the first single was filmed, a process that ended on the 7th of January 2009. The video was made public on the 12th of that same month and year. The video features the band playing in a white room, performing "On the Hill of Dreams".

Track listing
 "Swan Lake" - 7:59
 "On the Hill of Dreams" - 4:45
 "Phantom Queen" - 4:03
 "An End So Cold" - 4:00
 "Faustus" - 4:08
 "Don't Look Back" - 4:37
 "When the Sun Is Gone" - 4:37
 "For Her" - 4:37
 "The Enchanted Forest" - 3:32
 "The Sphinx" - 4:27
 "Fallen Leaves Waltz" - 2:37

Concepts
"Swan Lake" is based on Tchaikovsky's ballet
"Phantom Queen" is partly based on the story of Cú Chulainn, and The Morrígan
"An End So Cold" is based on Shakespeare's Ophelia
"Faustus" is based on Goethe's drama
"Don't Look Back" is based on the classical Greek legend of Orpheus and Eurydice
"For Her" is based on the story of Odysseus

References

2009 albums
Dark Moor albums
Scarlet Records albums